Shrirampur is a  village in the Sabang CD block in the Kharagpur subdivision of the Paschim Medinipur district in the state of West Bengal, India.

Geography

Location

Area overview
Kharagpur subdivision, shown partly in the map alongside, mostly has alluvial soils, except in two CD blocks in the west – Kharagpur I and Keshiary, which mostly have lateritic soils. Around 74% of the total cultivated area is cropped more than once. With a density of population of 787 per km2nearly half of the district's population resides in this subdivision. 14.33% of the population lives in urban areas and 86.67% lives in the rural areas.

Note: The map alongside presents some of the notable locations in the subdivision. All places marked in the map are linked in the larger full screen map.

Demographics
According to the 2011 Census of India, Shrirampur had a total population of 933, of which 489 (52%) were males and 444 (48%) were females. There were 100 persons in the age range of 0–6 years. The total number of literate persons in Shrirampur was 778 (93.40% of the population over 6 years).

.*For language details see Sabang (community development block)#Language and religion

Culture
David J. McCutchion mentions the Lakshmi Janardana temple of the Jana family as a richly terracotta decorated pancharatna with smooth rekha turrets measuring 17’ 8” square, built in 1870.

Shrirampur picture gallery

References

External links

Villages in Paschim Medinipur district